The Military Office of the Land Defence, from 1840 to 1922 called the Military Office of the Ministry of Land Defence, was an office in the Royal Chancery from 1840 to 1945, where all so-called ‘military command matters’ were handled and from where these accompanying dispatches (including general orders) were issued. In 1945, it was amalgamated into the Military Office of the Minister of Defence.

History
The Military Office of the Ministry of Land Defence traces its origins to the Office of Adjutant General (Generaladjutantsämbetet), which in connection with the departmental reforms of 1840 ceased. The Ministry of Land Defence and the Ministry for Naval Affairs were established, where – as far as the army is concerned – so-called command matters came to be handled within the ministry's military office (from 1922 called the Military Office of the Land Defence). The command matters were the matters of usually less importance which were decided by the king in his capacity as Supreme Commander of the Swedish Armed Forces on land. These mainly concerned the army's weapons exercises, schools, training, personnel accounting, service conditions, etc.

According to the 1925 Land Defence Army Order, the personnel at the Military Office of the Land Defence consist of:

1 chief, regimental officer with fees from the Ministry of Defence;
1 vice chief, regimental officer of the General Staff;
3 captains from the General Staff;
7 retired officers with fees from the Ministry of Defence;
2 active company officers, ordered from the troop units;
2 retired non-commissioned officers as office non-commissioned officers with fees from the Ministry of Defence; and
1 office guard with a salary from the Ministry of Defence
In addition, three aspirants in the General Staff were generally ordered to serve in the Military Office.

Command matters, in which they concerned the land defence, were mainly matters concerning the establishment of the exercise and service regulations as well as instructions for the training and exercises of the personnel; selection and distribution of conscripts for service; mobilization regulations; determination of models and testing of new equipment and materiel; drafting and placement of officers for service and extra functions; as well as certain applications for leave of absence and permission to stay abroad, etc. The mobilization and weapons exercise details are each handled by a company officer from the General Staff as well as other details of retired officers with fees from the ministry's state. For the handling of cases, the Military Office was according to the Defence Act of 1925 organized in eight special offices, namely the Registrar Office (Registratorsdetaljen), the List Office (Rulldetaljen), the Mobilization Office (Mobiliseringsdetaljen), the Weapons Exercise Office (Vapenövningsdetaljen), the Personnel Office (Personaldetaljen), the Conscription Office (Värnpliktsdetaljen) and the Book Office (Bokdetaljen) detail and the Office for the Service Announcements Concerning the Land Defence  (Tjänstemeddelanden rörande lantförsvaret, T.-L.-detaljen). The Mobilization and Weapons Exercise Offices are each handled by a company officer from the General Staff as well as other offices by retired officers with fees from the Ministry of Defence.

On 1 July 1945, the Military Office of the Land Defence was amalgamated into the Military Office of the Minister of Defence.

Location

The Ministry of Land Defence, like the Ministry for Naval Affairs, had its premises in the Stenbockska palatset at Birger Jarls torg 4, during the years 1840–1851. During this time, however, the Military Office was located in the so-called Preisiska huset on Drottninggatan.

Chief
The Military Office was led by a General Staff officer with usually the rank of colonel.

Chiefs

????–1846: Edvard August Peijron
1846–????: Pehr Christian Lovén
????–1853: ?
1853–1862: Eric af Klint
1862–1866: Sven Lagerberg
1866–1872: Carl Leijonhufvud
1872–1873: Hugo Raab
1873–1875: Axel Ryding
1875–1880: Otto Taube
1880–1886: Adam Anders Thorén
1886–1888: Hemming Gadd
1888–1891: Carl Warberg
1891–1892: Carl Nordensvan
1891–1897: Carl Axel Nordenskjöld
1897–1897: Hans Alexander Gustaf Altvater Pantzerhielm
1897–1899: Ebbe von Hofsten
1899–1900: Hugo Jungstedt
1900–1905: Magnus Blomstedt
1905–1909: Hugo Hult
1909–1912: ?
1912–1915: Georg Nyström
1915–1919: Hjalmar Säfwenberg
1919–1923: Oscar Nygren
1923–1926: Carl Sjögreen
1926–1929: Bo Boustedt
1929–1932: Erik Testrup
1932–1934: Torsten Friis
1934–1936: Ernst af Klercker
1936–1937: Helge Jung (acting)
1937–1938: Henry Tottie
1938–1945: Henry Kellgren

Vice chiefs

1858–1865: Fredrik Wrangel
1865–1867: ?
1867–1872: Daniel Nordlander
1872–1874: ?
1874–1875: Oskar Teodor Fåhræus
1875–1879: Carl Bror Munck af Fulkila
1880–1880: A.A. Thorén
1880–1883: Hemming Gadd
1884–1885: Anton Gustaf Jonas af Jochnick
1885–1886: Jesper Crusebjörn (acting)
1886–1888: Carl Warberg
1888–1891: Hans Adolf von Koch
1892–1893: Knut Gillis Bildt
1893–1895: Bengt Erland Eberhard (Ebbe) von Hofsten
1895–1899: Hugo Jungstedt
1899–1901: ?
1901–1903: Hugo Hult
1903–1904: Emil Mörcke (tjf)
1904–1906: ?
1906–1910: Carl Gustaf Hammarskjöld
1910–1915: ?
1915–1918: Oscar Nygren
1918–1920: Knut Albert Fredrik Lindencrona
1920–1928: ?
1928–1930: Hjalmar Falk
1930–1935: ?
1935–1937: Henry Tottie
1937–1944: ?
1944–1945: Per Kellin

Footnotes

References

Defunct government agencies of Sweden
Government agencies established in 1840
Government agencies disestablished in 1945